The first season of the History Channel television series Top Shot commenced airing on June 6, 2010, and concluded on August 15, 2010. The season contained ten episodes, and was filmed over a period of 33 days in the spring in Santa Clarita, California. The winner of the season was British ex-Army captain Iain Harrison.

Iain Harrison later appeared as a coach in Seasons 2, 3, and 4; J.J. Racaza appeared as a coach in Season 2; Kelly Bachand appeared as a coach in Season 4; and Blake Miguez appeared as a coach in Season 2.

Chris Cerino, Peter Palma, Kelly Bachand, Adam Benson, and Blake Miguez returned for Top Shot: All-Stars. Miguez finished in 15th, Bachand finished in 9th, Benson finished in 7th, and Palma finished in 6th, while Cerino was the season's runner-up. According to Colby Donaldson's Twitter, J.J Racaza became a father during filming and was unable to come out for the show.

Contestants

Contestant progress

 The player's team (episodes 1–8) won the challenge.
 The player(s) won individually in the challenge.
 The player's team lost the challenge, but the player was not nominated for elimination (episodes 1–8); or the player did not finish a challenge at the top or bottom of the group (episodes 9–10).
 The player was nominated for elimination, but won an elimination challenge (episodes 1–8); or the player finished a challenge at the bottom of the group, but won a tiebreaker (episodes 9–10).
 The player lost an elimination challenge and was eliminated. (In episodes 9 and 10, every challenge ended in one or more automatic eliminations.)
 The player voluntarily withdrew from the competition.
 The player won the $100,000 grand prize and the title of Top Shot.
 The player came in second.

Episodes

Episode 1: "The Long Shot"

The trainer for both challenges was Craig Sawyer, Navy SEALs instructor and former sniper.

Episode 2: "Zipline of Fire"

The trainer for the team challenge was Ben Stoeger, practical shooting expert. The trainer for the elimination challenge was Matt Burkett, practical shooting expert.

 There was a second-place tie between Brad and Bill. It was broken by Peter's vote.
 Frank and Brad finished in a tie after the first run, but Frank lost on a tiebreaker run.

Episode 3: "Archer Enemies"

The trainer for the team challenge was Chris Palmer, longbow and traditional archery expert. The trainer for the elimination challenge was Bill Troubridge, crossbow expert.

Episode 4: "Friend or Foe?"

The trainer for both challenges was Craig Sawyer, Navy SEALs instructor and former sniper.

Episode 5: "The Good, the Rat and the Ugly"

The trainer for both challenges was Garry James, historical rifle expert.

Episode 6: "Wild, Wild West"

The trainer for both challenges was Spencer Hoglund, historical weapons expert and four-time national champion speed shooter.

 There was a second-place tie between Denny and Andre. It was broken by Brad's vote.
 Both players tied in the first round by making a royal flush. For the tiebreaker, each was allowed only 5 shots and could not use any cards shot in the first round. After 4 shots, Kelly hit three fives, making it impossible for Andre to win as he only had a pair of fours at that point.

Episode 7: "Trick Shot Showdown"

The trainer for the team challenge was Jon "Trick Shot" Wilson. The trainer for the elimination challenge was Scott Robertson, eight-time sporting clay shooting champion.

Episode 8: "The Razor's Edge"

The trainer for the team challenge was Todd Abrams, member of the International Knife Throwers Hall of Fame. The trainer for the elimination challenge was John "Chief AJ" Huffer, slingshot world record holder.

Tara received news of her father's rapidly declining health (due to lung cancer) and withdrew from the competition after the team challenge. A note at the end of Episode 10 stated that he has since died.

Episode 9: "The Shortest Fuse"
At the start of this episode, Donaldson announced that the teams were being dissolved, and that all players would compete head-to-head to determine who would be eliminated in each challenge. The seven remaining players were given green shirts to wear for the rest of the competition.

The trainer for the second elimination challenge was Craig Sawyer, Navy SEALs instructor and former sniper.

 In the first round, Iain, Blake, Kelly, J.J, and Chris failed to break the fuse. A tiebreaker was played under the same rules, with only Kelly and Blake failing this time. For the second tiebreaker, each player had 10 seconds to fire one shot at a target; the one who hit closer to the center of the bullseye stayed in the game.

Episode 10: "Season Finale"
No practice sessions were held in this episode. The five individual players eliminated prior to the final challenge returned to watch it.

 J.J. and Iain were the first-round winners, and Chris won the playoff between himself and Peter.

Epilogue
The episode concluded with an epilogue revealing the recent activities and achievements of all 16 players, in order of their elimination.

Mike Seeklander is competing at the World Speed Shooting Championships.
Frank Campana is working part-time as a bodyguard.
Bill Carns continues to work on his radio show. Kelly has been a recent guest.
James "Jim" Sinclair recently won a national match with historic rifles.
Caleb Giddings now works for the NRA.
Andre Robinson has returned to his Army base in South Korea.
Brad Engmann is now competing nationally with a new pistol. It is not a Glock.
Tara Poremba's father died. She continues to compete in his honor.
Denny Chapman won the Men's All-Around World Championships (Cowboy Action Shooting + Mounted Shooting) at the SASS "End of Trail" Finals in 2011.
Blake Miguez is running his father's company, which is helping cleaning up the Gulf oil spill.
Adam Benson is looking forward to the start of hunting season.
Kelly Bachand has taken up pistol shooting. He returns to college in the fall.
Peter Palma's time as a reservist is nearly over. He is considering a move to Louisiana.
Simon "J.J." Racaza still holds the world record in the Iron Sight Division.
Chris Cerino just moved into a new house and still works as a shooting instructor.
Iain Harrison is back managing a construction company. So far he has no plans for his winnings.

Nomination range

References

2010 American television seasons